Gayathri Maduve is a 1983 Indian Kannada-language film,  directed by  B. Mallesh and produced by Lakshman. The film stars Anant Nag, Ambika, Roopadevi and Tiger Prabhakar. The film has musical score by Rajan–Nagendra.

Cast

Anant Nag
Ambika
Roopadevi
Tiger Prabhakar
Jayamalini
K. S. Ashwath
Vajramuni
Dinesh
Mysore Lokesh

Soundtrack
The music was composed by Rajan–Nagendra.

References

1983 films
1980s Kannada-language films
Films scored by Rajan–Nagendra
Films directed by B. Mallesh